Higher Ashton is a village on the western slopes of Haldon in Teignbridge, Devon, England. Along with Lower Ashton it is part of the civil parish of Ashton, which in 2001 had a population of 174.

It features remains of the Chudleigh family manor whose most complete surviving range has been converted into the house Place Barton, and a fifteenth-century church with an Elizabethan pulpit. The fifteenth-century font still has a bar to lock it against witchcraft. Other fifteenth-century features are the benches, some stained glass and the screen.

External links

Villages in Devon